FK Smiltene/BJSS is a Latvian football club. They compete in the second-highest division of Latvian football (1. līga) and Latvian Football Cup.
They are based in Smiltene.

First-team squad
As of 26 August, 2020.

References

External links 
  

Football clubs in Latvia